Banque Internationale Arabe de Tunisie (BIAT) is the largest private sector bank in Tunisia. It is listed on the Tunisian Stock Exchange (Bourse de Tunis).

Overview
The Banque Internationale Arabe de Tunisie was founded in 1976, as a result of a merger of the Tunisian branches of the Société Marseillaise de Crédit and the British Bank of the Middle East. It is headquartered in Tunis, Tunisia. It has 185 offices in Tunisia and 1 office in Libya. It has announced it will open additional branches in Algeria and Morocco.

References

External links 
 
 

Banks established in 1976
Banks of Tunisia
Economy of Tunis
1976 establishments in Tunisia
Companies listed on the Bourse de Tunis